The 1963–64 season was the 61st season of competitive football in Belgium. RSC Anderlechtois won their 10th Division I title. Standard Liège entered the 1963–64 European Champion Clubs' Cup as Belgian title holder and RFC Liégeois and ARA La Gantoise entered the 1963–64 Inter-Cities Fairs Cup. The Belgian Cup competition resumed to allow the cup winner to enter the 1964–65 European Cup Winners' Cup, and was won by ARA La Gantoise against KFC Diest (4-2 after extra time). The Belgium national football team played 6 friendly games (2 wins, 2 draws, 2 losses).

Overview 
At the end of the season, KFC Turnhout and RFC Malinois were relegated to Division II and were replaced in Division I by RU Saint-Gilloise and R Tilleur FC from Division II.
The bottom 2 clubs in Division II (KRC Mechelen and K Kortrijk Sport) were relegated to Division III, to be replaced by K Waterschei SV Thor Genk and K Sint-Niklaasse SK from Division III.
The bottom clubs of each Division III league (K Tongerse SV Cercle, K Daring Club Leuven, KFC Eeklo and KFC Waeslandia Burcht) were relegated to the Promotion, to be replaced by K Van Neste Genootschap Oostende, RCS Schaerbeek, KFC Winterslag and R Wavre Sports from Promotion.

National team 

* Belgium score given first

Key
 H = Home match
 A = Away match
 N = On neutral ground
 F = Friendly
 o.g. = own goal

European competitions 
Standard Liège lost in the preliminary round of the 1963–64 European Champion Clubs' Cup to IFK Norrköping of Sweden (won 1-0 at home, lost 0-2 away).

2 Belgian clubs entered the Inter-Cities Fairs Cup (for the first time):
In the First Round, RFC Liégeois defeated FC Aris Bonnevoie of Luxembourg (win 2-0 away, drew 0-0 at home) while ARA La Gantoise were eliminated by FC Köln of West Germany (lost 1-3 away, drew 1-1 at home).
In the Second Round, RFC Liégeois defeated Arsenal FC (drew 1-1 away, won 3-1 at home).
In the Quarter Finals, they beat Spartak Brno of Czechoslovakia (won 2-0 at home, lost 0-2 away, won 1-0 in the play-off game).
In the Semifinals, RFC Liégeois lost against Real Zaragoza of Spain (win 1-0 at home, lost 1-2 away, lost 0-2 in the play-off game).

Honours

Final league tables

Premier Division 

 1963-64 Top scorer: Paul Van Himst (RSC Anderlechtois) with 26 goals.
 1963 Golden Shoe: Jean Nicolay (Standard Liège)

References